Debaki Bose (1898–1971), also known as Debaki Kumar Bose, was an Indian director, writer, and actor who is recognized for his contribution in Hindi as well as Bengali cinema. He was born on 25 November 1898 in Akalposh, (now East Burdwan), Burdwan, Bengal Presidency, British India. He died on 17 November 1971 in Calcutta, West Bengal, India. He is known for his innovative use of sound and music in Indian Cinema. He worked first under the banner of British Dominion Films of Dhiren Ganguly and later with Pramathesh Barua's Barua Pictures and finally he joined New Theatres banner in 1932. He started his own production company, Debaki Productions, in 1945.

Early life
Debaki Bose was son of a successful advocate in Burdwan. He graduated from Vidyasagar College but left the university. Inspired by Mahatma Gandhi's call for non-co-operation movement, he walked out of an examination and started living on his own. He opened a shop in local market selling towels and he was also an editor of a local weekly named Shakti. Dhiren Ganguly, better known as DG, an established film director from Calcutta, was visiting Burdwan at that time. DG met Debaki and as he came know about Debaki's writing skill, he invited Debaki to come to Calcutta and to write film scripts for him. This culminated into the first film made by British Dominion Films named Kamonar Agun (or Flames of Flesh).

Career highlights
 Debaki Bose was a top Indian film director in his time. During this period, many of the Bengali films made by him were also released in Hindi and even in Marathi and Tamil.
 Chandidas (1932), directed by him, contained background music for the first time in Indian Cinema.  Raichand Boral, also known as R.C. Boral was the music director. 
 Seeta (1934), made under the banner of East India Film Company, was the first Indian talkie shown in any international film festival. It was shown in Venice Film Festival, where it won an Honorary Diploma. He was the 1st Indian director to receive any international award.
 Sagar Sangamey (1959) was nominated for Golden Bear at the 9th Berlin International Film Festival (1959). This film got National Film Award for Best Feature Film at the 6th National Film Awards ceremony in 1959.
 Arghya (1961) was a very special documentary film, produced by the Government of West Bengal on the occasion of Rabindranath Tagore's birth centennial. It was based on four poems of Tagore: Pujarini, Puratan Bhritya, Abhisar and Dui Bigha Jami.
 He received Sangeet Natak Akademi Award for Film Direction in 1957.
 He received Padma Shri in Arts in 1958.
 He is one of the greatest film icons to never receive the Dadasaheb Phalke Award.

Filmography

Director
 Panchasar (1930)
 Shadows of the Dead (1931)
 Aparadhi (1931) (Hindi Title: Aparadhi Abla, English Title: The Culprit)
 Nishir Dak (1932)
 Chandidas (1932)
 Puran Bhagat (1933) (English title: The Devoted)
 Meerabai (1933)
 Rajrani Meera (1933)
 Dulari Bibi (1933)
 Seeta (1934)
 Jeevan Natak (1935)
 Inquilab (1935)
 Sonar Sansar (1936) (Hindi Title: Sunhera Sansar)
 Bidyapati (1937) (Hindi Title: Vidyapati)
 Sapera (1939) (English Title: The Snake-Charmer, Bengali Title: Sapurey)
 Nartaki (1940) (Hindi Title: Nartaki)
 Abhinava (1940)
 Apna Ghar (1942) (Marathi Title: Apule Ghar)
 Shri Ramanuja (1943)
 Swarg Se Sundar Desh Hamara (1945)
 Meghdoot (1945)
 Krishna Leela (1946)
 Alakananda (1947)
 Chandrashekhar (1947)
 Sir Sankarnath (1948)
 Kavi (1949)
 Ratnadeep (1951) (Tamil title: Ratnadeepam)
 Pathik (1953)
 Kavi (1954)
 Bhagaban Shrikrishna Chaitanya (1954) (Hindi Title: Bhagaban Shrikrishna Chaitanya or Chaitanya Mahaprabhu)
 Bhalobasa (1955)
 Nabajanma (1956)
 Chirakumar Sabha (1956)
 Sonar Kathi (1958)
 Sagar Sangamey (1959) (English Title: Holy Island)
 Arghya (1961)

Writer
 Flames of Flesh (1930) (screenplay) (Bengali title: Kamonar Agun)
 Aparadhi/Aparadhi Abla/The Culprit  (1931) (story)
 Chandidas (1932) (writer)
 Meerabai/Rajrani Meera (1933) (screenplay) (story)
 Jeevan Natak (1935) (screenplay) (story)
 Inquilab (1935) (screenplay) (story)
 Sonar Sansar /Sunehra Sansar (1936) (writer)
 Bidyapati (1937) (writer + screenplay)
 Sapurey/Sapera (1939) (writer)
 Nartaki (1940) (story + screenplay)
 Chandrashekhar (1947) (screenplay)
 Sagar Sangamey (1959) (English Title: Holy Island)

Actor
 Flames of Flesh (1930) (Bengali title: Kamonar Agun)
 Panchasar (1930)
 Charitraheen (1931)

Awards

National Film Awards

1953: All India Certificate of Merit for Best Feature Film – Bhagavan Sri Krishna Chaitanya

References

External links
 
 A page on Debaki Bose in abasar.net  

1898 births
1971 deaths
Bengali male actors
Male actors in Bengali cinema
20th-century Indian film directors
Bengali film directors
Recipients of the Padma Shri in arts
Recipients of the Sangeet Natak Akademi Award
University of Calcutta alumni
20th-century Indian male actors
20th-century Indian dramatists and playwrights
Bengali screenwriters
People from Bardhaman
Male actors from West Bengal
Screenwriters from West Bengal
Indian silent film directors
Film directors from West Bengal
Directors who won the Best Feature Film National Film Award
20th-century Indian screenwriters
Film directors from Kolkata